The Civil United Green Alternative movement, GROZA movement (lit. "Thunderstorm"), formerly Interregional Green Party, is a Russian movement, founded in 1991 as a local party in Leningrad. In 2005, it reorganized in the green political movement "Green Alternative" (GROZA). The movement is an associate member of the European Green Party.

See also
 Green party
 Green politics
 List of environmental organizations
 Russian Ecological Party "The Greens" (former KEDR Party)
 Union of Greens of Russia
 Green Alliance (Russia) (political party founded in 2012)

References

External links
 Resist.ru: Green Alternative (GROZA) official website 
 official website (Internet Archive)
 European Greens profile for Green Alternative (GROZA)
 Zelenaya Alternativa / GROZA (europeangreens.eu)

Green political parties in Russia
Political parties established in 1991
Political parties in the Soviet Union
Global Greens member parties
European Green Party
1991 establishments in Russia